The 39th Saturn Awards, honoring the best in science fiction, fantasy and horror film and television in 2012, were held on June 26, 2013, and hosted by Wayne Brady. The awards were presented by the Academy of Science Fiction, Fantasy and Horror Films.

The seven Best Film Award categories were respectively won by The Avengers (Science Fiction), Life of Pi (Fantasy), The Cabin in the Woods (Horror or Thriller), Skyfall (Action or Adventure), Headhunters (International), Killer Joe (Independent) and Frankenweenie (Animated). The Avengers led the winners with four wins.

In the television categories, Breaking Bad won three of its four nominations, including Best Television Presentation. Revolution, The Walking Dead and Teen Wolf won the other Best Series Awards.

The ceremony was dedicated to the memory of author Richard Matheson, who died just days prior to being set to receive the Visionary Award. Other honorees included Lifetime Achievement Award recipient and filmmaker William Friedkin, Life Career Award recipient and actor/director Jonathan Frakes and the Dan Curtis Legacy Award recipient and producer/creator Vince Gilligan.

Winners and nominees 
Reference:

Film

Television

Programs

Acting

Home video

References

External links 
 Official Saturn Awards website

Saturn Awards ceremonies
Saturn
2012 film awards
2012 television awards
2013 in California